Balls Out is the second studio album by the American glam metal band Steel Panther. It was released on October 28, 2011, on Universal Republic Records.

Production and release
In an interview in May 2011, guitarist Satchel said that the band had begun recording new material in August 2010, and by May 2011 had completed all fifteen songs planned for the album.

The album was officially announced on July 19, 2011 and the title was announced on August 22. The album is produced by Jay Ruston, who previously worked with the band on their album Feel the Steel.

On September 6, it was announced that the album's release date had been pushed back from October 18 to 31, though it was released in Europe on iTunes on October 28.

The first singles of the album are "If You Really, Really Love Me" in the United Kingdom and "17 Girls In A Row" in the United States.

Guest appearances on the album are made by Dane Cook on "In the Future" and by Chad Kroeger and Nuno Bettencourt on "It Won't Suck Itself".

The album is indexed (Liste A, only allowed to be sold to adults after request) in Germany by the Bundesprüfstelle für jugendgefährdende Medien (BPjM) since September 2012.

Reception

Commercial
The album debuted at #41 in Canada, and debuted at #40 on the Billboard 200 chart with first-week sales of 12,000 copies in the United States.

Critical
Balls Out has received generally positive reviews from critics. Metacritic has given the album a score of 68, based on four reviews. Allmusic gave Balls Out a rating of three out of five stars, and said that "[a]s a hair metal album, Balls Out is finely crafted and well produced, evoking the glossy sound of the era, but as a joke, it’s pretty one-note, so either you’re going to get it or it's going to grate on you."Brave Words & Bloody Knuckles gave the album a rating of nine out of ten stars, saying that "[f]rom start to finish, Balls Out is 14 bundles of fun." Canadian music and entertainment website Rockstar Weekly gave the album a perfect 5 stars saying "For those lucky enough to understand the joke, Balls Out is the standout album of the year. It just plain kicks ass."

Track listing
The track listing of Balls Out was announced on August 26, 2011.

Personnel
Michael Starr – lead vocals, backing vocals
Satchel – guitars, acoustic guitar, backing vocals
Lexxi Foxxx – bass, backing vocals
Stix Zadinia – drums, (piano on "Weenie Ride"), backing vocals
Jay Ruston & Steel Panther – production
Michael Lord – orchestration on "Weenie Ride"
Jay Ruston – engineering & mixing
Nick Rucker – additional overdub engineering
Ara Sarkasian – assistant engineer
F. Scott Schafer – photography

Guests
 Chad Kroeger (Nickelback) – co-lead vocals on "It Won't Suck Itself"
 Nuno Bettencourt (Extreme) – guitar solo on "It Won't Suck Itself"
Heidi Murphy – female vocals on "It Won't Suck Itself"
Dane Cook – narration on "In the Future"
Joe Lester, Matt Nelson, Brett Anderson, Eden Blackman & Jay Ruston – background gang vocals

Recorded at Clear Lake Audio, Burbank, California. Overdubs mixed at TRS West, Sherman Oaks, California.

References

2011 albums
Steel Panther albums
Universal Republic Records albums